Ayşe Hubbi Hatun ("the living one" or "womanly" and "the ammirated one"; died 1590) was a lady-in-waiting to Sultan Selim II and later to his son Sultan Murad III of the Ottoman Empire. She was a notable Ottoman poetess of the sixteenth century.

Early life
Born as Ayşe, Hubbi Hatun spent her early childhood in the city of Amasya. She was the daughter of Şeyh Akşemseddin, and granddaughter of Beşiktaşlı Şeyh Yahya Efendi. She was very well educated, and had learned Arabic, studied poetry.

Marriage
She married her first cousin, son of her maternal aunt, Prince Selim's tutor, Akşemseddinzade Şemsi Efendi, milk brother of Sultan Suleiman the Magnificent.  She had a daughter married to poet Mehmed Vusuli Efendi, known as Molla Çelebi. A garden in Fındıklı belonged to Hubbi Hatun.

Career
After her husband's death in 1551, she remained at the court and was a boon companion of Prince Selim. Hubbi Hatun was famous for her beauty and poetry. She was rumoured to have had love affairs with several of Selim's courtiers. When Selim ascended the throne in 1566, Hubbi came to Istanbul. After Selim's death in 1574, Hubbi Hatun became a lady-in-waiting to his son, the new Sultan Murad III. She had been influential in the reign of both Sultan Selim II and his son Murad III, along with other musahibes (favourites) of Murad, who included mistress of the housekeeper Canfeda Hatun and mistress of financial affairs Raziye Hatun.

Death

She died in 1590 in Istanbul and was buried at Eyüp cemetery.

Poetry
She wrote lyric poems (gazel) and odes (kaside). She also wrote a narrative poem (mesnevi) under the title "Hürşid and Cemşid", which consisted of more than three thousands of beyits. Her style of writing poetry was not feminine, and wrote just like her male colleagues. She was praised in tezkires for her poetic skills. The poetic persona (mahlas) “Hubbi”, with which Hubbi Hatun signed her gazels in the last hemistich, can also be found at the end of a risale (message or letter), a short work on religious warfare entitled “İmadu’l-Cihad”.

The following poetry was written by Hubbi.

Being feminine is no shame to the name of the sun...
Being masculine is no glory to the crescent moon. 

Another set of poetry written by Hubbi Hatun included, "Der Rağbet-i Dua":
Dua temsili Yusuf gibi her demKim ana müşteridir halkı alem

Verir her kişi makdurunca gevherAnın ta müşterisinden olalar

Sen oldun şimdi hem ol zen misaliKaçan arz eyledi Yusuf cemali

Geturüp nice rişte anda bir zenHıridar oldu ana canu dilden

References

Sources

External links
 Women writers of Turkey: Hubbi Ayşe Kadın

1590 deaths
16th-century women writers from the Ottoman Empire
Ladies-in-waiting of the Ottoman Empire